NGC 386 is an elliptical galaxy located in the constellation Pisces. It was discovered on November 4, 1850 by Bindon Stoney. It was described by Dreyer as "considerably faint, small, round." Along with galaxies NGC 375, NGC 379, NGC 382, NGC 383, NGC 384, NGC 385, NGC 387 and NGC 388, NGC 386 forms a galaxy cluster called Arp 331.

References

External links
 

0386
18501104
Pisces (constellation)
Elliptical galaxies
003989